Michael Wai-Man Choi  (born 4 March 1959) is an Australian Labor Party politician who represented the electoral district of Capalaba in the Legislative Assembly of Queensland.

Political career
Choi was elected to Parliament on 17 February 2001. He was appointed by Peter Beattie as a Parliamentary Secretary in 2006. After Anna Bligh became Premier in 2007, he and Gary Fenlon both acted as Parliamentary Secretary to the Minister for Transport, Trade, Employment and Industrial Relations, John Mickel, and Choi also assisted Lindy Nelson-Carr with her Multicultural Affairs brief. Following the 2009 state election, he was appointed Parliamentary Secretary for Natural Resources, Water and Energy and Trade, assisting Stephen Robertson. From February 2011 to March 2012, he was Parliamentary Secretary for Trade and Multicultural Affairs. Choi was defeated in the 2012 state election.

Family and professional life
He is married and has three daughters.

Choi is a professional chartered engineer.

Choi has served as Honorary Ambassador for Brisbane city, fostering ties between Brisbane and Asia Pacific countries, as well as chairing the Sister Cities Committee with the Chinese city of Shenzhen. As president of the Valley Business Association, he helped the Valley business community through the Fitzgerald Inquiry period.

He is also involved in many professional and community organisations such as the Housing Industry Association, and the Small Business Council of Queensland, and was a director of Queensland Ballet Inc.

References

1959 births
Living people
Members of the Queensland Legislative Assembly
Australian politicians of Chinese descent
Australian engineers
Australian Labor Party members of the Parliament of Queensland
21st-century Australian politicians
Recipients of the Medal of the Order of Australia
People from Redland City